Rookwood is a suburb in western Sydney, in the state of New South Wales, Australia located  west of the Sydney central business district, in the local government area of the Cumberland Council. It is the easternmost suburb in greater western Sydney.

Rookwood Cemetery is the largest cemetery in the Southern Hemisphere.

History
Rookwood was named from a title of an 1834 novel by William Harrison Ainsworth (1805–1882). A railway station called Haslam's Creek was opened in this area in 1859, on the railway line from Sydney to Parramatta. Samuel Haslam owned various grants beside the creek from 1804. Haslam's Creek was the site of the first railway disaster in New South Wales in July 1858, which resulted in two deaths.

When the necropolis opened in 1867, it was known as Haslam's Creek Cemetery. Residents disliked the association with the burial ground and in 1876 the suburb was renamed Rookwood. The name of the railway station was changed to Rookwood in 1878; and, by the 1880s, shops were established in the area. In 1891, the Municipality of Rookwood was incorporated (renamed Lidcombe in 1913).

Over time, the necropolis had become known as Rookwood Cemetery. By 1898, residents were again agitated about the association of their suburb with the cemetery; and, in 1914, the railway station and the residential part of the suburb became Lidcombe. Later, Rookwood railway station that served the Rookwood Cemetery was located between the bridge over Arthur street and the westernmost junction of the Flemington rail yard.

The Municipality of Lidcombe amalgamated with Auburn from 1 January 1949.

Population
Rookwood is part of a contiguous area with no or very low population between the Inner West area to the east and the Greater Western Sydney area to the west, alongside neighbouring suburbs like Chullora and Sydney Olympic Park. In the 2021 Australian census, Rookwood was reported as having "no people or a very low population".

Transport
Rookwood railway station was on Sydney's Main Suburban railway line until its closure in 1967. The Rookwood Cemetery Line serviced Rookwood Cemetery and originally ran from Mortuary railway station, on Regent Street near Central railway station but has since closed.

The Cemetery railway line opened on 22 October 1864. At the time of its opening the line went as far as Cemetery Station No. 1. On 26 May 1897 an extension of the line to Cemetery Station No. 3 was opened. The extension required the removal of a waiting room on the rear wall of the Cemetery Station No. 1, so the line could pass right through the building. A final extension, to Cemetery Station No. 4 opened on 19 June 1908. The line closed in 1948.

References

The Book of Sydney Suburbs, Compiled by Frances Pollon, Angus & Robertson Publishers, 1990, Published in Australia 

Suburbs of Sydney
Cumberland Council, New South Wales